Tung O may refer to:
Tung O, a village near Yung Shue Ha by Tung O Wan, Lamma Island, southern New Territories, Hong Kong
Tung O, an area near Tung O Wan on Crooked Island (Kat O), northeastern New Territories, Hong Kong